"Money to Burn" is a song by English singer-songwriter Richard Ashcroft and is the eighth track on his 2000 album Alone with Everybody. The song was also released on 12 June 2000 as the second single from that album in the United Kingdom. The single peaked at No. 17 in the UK Singles Chart.

Music video
A video directed by Jonathan Glazer, who had already directed the video for "A Song for the Lovers", was in production and had cost half a million pounds, but Ashcroft cancelled it because he didn't think that Glazer's take "captured the mood of the song." Ashcroft then hired Robert Hales to direct the new video which took place on Wall Street.

Track listing
 CD HUTCD136, 12-inch HUTT136, cassette HUTC136
 "Money to Burn" – 6:15
 "Leave Me High" – 5:22
 "XXYY" – 4:24

References

2000 singles
2000 songs
Hut Records singles
Music videos directed by Robert Hales
Richard Ashcroft songs
Song recordings produced by Chris Potter (record producer)
Songs written by Richard Ashcroft